Fridlevus I is one of the legendary Danish kings described in Saxo Grammaticus' Gesta Danorum.

Text

Notes

References
 Davidson, Hilda Ellis (ed.) and Peter Fisher (tr.) (1999). Saxo Grammaticus : The History of the Danes : Books I-IX. Bury St Edmunds: St Edmundsbury Press. . First published 1979–1980.
 Elton, Oliver (tr.) (1905). The Nine Books of the Danish History of Saxo Grammaticus. New York: Norroena Society. Available online
 Olrik, J. and H. Ræder (1931). Saxo Grammaticus : Gesta Danorum. Available online



Mythological kings of Denmark